A wife is a female participant in a marriage.

Wife or WIFE may also refer to:

Literature
 The Wife of Bath's Tale, a tale from Geoffrey Chaucer's Canterbury Tales
 Wife (novel), a 1975 novel by Bharati Mukherjee
A Wife, 1614 poem by Sir Thomas Overbury
The Wife (play), an 1833 play by James Sheridan Knowles
"The Wife", 1819 essay by Washington Irving from The Sketch Book of Geoffrey Crayon, Gent.
The Wife (novel), 2003 novel by Meg Wolitzer

Film and TV
 Wife (film), a 1953 film directed by Mikio Naruse
 The Wife (1995 film), a 1995 film by Tom Noonan
 The Wife (2017 film), a 2017 film based on Meg Wolitzer's novel with Glenn Close in the title role.
 "The Wife" (Seinfeld), an episode of the NBC sitcom Seinfeld

Music
 Wives (band), a US punk band
 WIFE (musician), the electronic music act of Irish musician James Kelly

Broadcast stations 
WIFE-FM, a radio station (94.3 FM) licensed to serve Rushville, Indiana, which has identified as WIFE-FM since 2007
WIFE-FM (Indianapolis), a former radio station (107.9 FM) licensed to serve Indianapolis, Indiana, from 1963 to 1976
WTLC (AM), a radio station (1310 AM) licensed to serve Indianapolis, Indiana, which held the call sign WIFE from 1963 to 1976
WKEF, a television station (channel 22) licensed to serve Dayton, Ohio, which held the call sign WIFE (TV) from 1953 to 1959
WTUE, a radio station (104.7 FM) licensed to serve Dayton, Ohio, which held the call sign WIFE (FM) from 1959 to 1961
WLPK, a radio station (1580 AM) licensed to serve Connersville, Indiana, which held the call sign WIFE from 1983 to 1994

See also

 Common-law wife
 Housewife
 Work wife
 Ex-wife